Strelkov (from стрелок meaning shooter) is a Russian masculine surname, its feminine counterpart is Strelkova. It may refer to

 Alexandra Strelkova (1833–1902), Russian stage actress
 Denis Strelkov (born 1990), race walker
 Igor Strelkov (born 1982), Russian footballer
 Igor Girkin (born 1970), Russian military commander nicknamed "Strelkov"
Inga Strelkova-Oboldina (born 1968), Russian theatre and film actress
Natalia Strelkova (born 1961), Russian figure skater

Russian-language surnames